Roberto José Guerrero Isaza (born 16 November 1958) is a Colombian-American former race driver.  He participated in 29 Formula One Grands Prix, debuting on 23 January 1982, becoming the first Colombian to start a Formula One Grand Prix.

With no championship points in Formula One and no prospects to drive for a competitive team, Guerrero left at the end of the 1983 season to race in the United States. He had an auspicious beginning to his Indycar racing career, winning both CART and Indianapolis 500 rookie of the year honors in 1984. His initial promise was never completely fulfilled, winning only two CART races, both in 1987. Later the same year he had a massive accident which left him in a coma for 17 days.

Of special note were Guerrero's participations in the Indianapolis 500. He came very close to winning outright on two occasions, but bad luck always kept the victory out of his grasp. In 1992 he spun off on the pace lap after having qualified on the pole position. Guerrero finished runner up twice, in the top-five five times, and held the qualifying speed record from 1992 through 1996. Guerrero was also selected to participate in the 1988 International Race of Champions.

Guerrero became a naturalized citizen of the United States in 1989. He and his wife have three children and reside in San Juan Capistrano in Orange County, California.

In recent years Guerrero has returned to racing, but of a different venue. He began off-road racing at the legendary Baja 2000. He has since continued to race in Baja 1000 events and guide tours of the Baja Peninsula with Wide Open Baja.

Early racing

Karting
Guerrero began his racing career in 1972 by competing in kart racing. From 1972 to 1977 he won two national championships in his native Colombia. He also finished third in the 1975 Pan American Karting Championship.

Jim Russell Driving School
Guerrero then joined the Jim Russell Racing School in 1977. In the school's six events Guerrero managed to win 5 of the races and finished second in the other race.

Open wheel racing

Formula car racing

British Formula Ford 1600
Guerrero began competing in British Formula Ford 1600 in 1978. He took eight wins during the season.

Formula Three

British Formula 3
Guerrero competed in Vandervell British Formula 3 for Angila Cars in an Argo JM3-Toyota. He finished 9th in points with 15 points.

Guerrero returned to the series in 1980 with Argo Racing Cars in an Argo JM6-Toyota. During the season he scored five victories at Thruxton Circuit (twice), Cadwell Park, Brands Hatch and Oulton Park. He tied for second in points with Kenneth Acheson, each with 95 points.

European Formula Three
While competing in British Formula 3 Guerrero competed in European Formula Three. He again drove for Angila Cars in an Argo JM3-Toyota. At the end of the season he scored 2 points to finish in 25th place in the championship.

European Formula Two
In  Guerrero began competing in European Formula Two for Maurer Motorsport in a Maurer MM81-BMW. He won the Jochen Rindt Memorial Trophy at the Thruxton Circuit. His next best finishes were a pair of 4th-place finishes at the Gran Premio del Mediterraneo at Enna-Pergusa and the Gran Premio dell'Adriatico at the Misano Circuit and he finished 7th in the championship with 16 points.

Formula One

Guerrero began competing in Formula One in 1982 for Ensign Racing, beginning the season in a No. 14 Café de Colombia/Moda Caribu Ensign N180B-Ford Cosworth DFV at the season-opening South African Grand Prix. He failed to qualify for the event due to Guerrero's Formula Two team Maurer Motorsport and its boss Willy Maurer filing an injunction to Ensign team boss Morris Nunn and as a result Guerrero was withdrawn from the race. An official press report from Nunn stated that Guerrero was "in an inappropriate physical and mental condition to drive." Guerrero returned for the following race, the Brazilian Grand Prix, in a new Ensign N181. He again failed to qualify for the race. Guerrero qualified for the third race of the season, the United States Grand Prix West, starting 19th and finished 15th after crashing 27 laps into the race. Ensign skipped the San Marino Grand Prix due to the FISA–FOCA war and Guerrero then failed to qualify for the Belgian Grand Prix. At the Monaco Grand Prix Ensign's tire supplier Avon withdrew from Formula One and that left the team tireless. The team got some older tires to use for the race, but Guerrero failed to qualify. Michelin started supplying tires to the team after Monaco and Guerrero qualified for Michelin's first race for the team, the Detroit Grand Prix, starting in a respectable 11th place. In the race Guerrero was involved in a crash 6 laps into the race and was credited with a 19th-place finish. After that, Guerrero then only failed to qualify at the Dutch Grand Prix and the French Grand Prix. Guerrero scored his best finish of 1982 (and his entire Formula One career) at the German Grand Prix with an 8th-place finish. At the season-ending Caesars Palace Grand Prix Guerrero qualified in 15th place. The car's engine then blew in the warm up and Guerrero missed the race. Guerrero was unranked in the championship standings due to the fact that he had scored no points.

In 1983 Ensign Racing merged with Theodore Racing and as a result Guerrero began driving the No. 33 Café de Colombia Theodore N183-Ford Cosworth DFV. Guerrero only failed to qualify at the Monaco Grand Prix and became more consistent in finishing races. Despite this Guerrero's best finishes were a pair of 12th-place finishes at the Dutch Grand Prix and the European Grand Prix. At the end of the season Guerrero again failed to score points and was as a result unranked in the championship while rookie teammate Johnny Cecotto managed to get a 6th-place finish and with it 1 point towards the championship for himself and Theodore (although Cecotto failed to qualify four times to Guerrero's single time).

Indy car racing

CART Indycar World Series

Guerrero made his Indy car debut in 1984 for Bignotti-Carter Racing in the No. 9 Master Mechanic March 84C-Cosworth DFX with legendary chief mechanic George Bignotti serving as Guerrero's chief mechanic. The high point of Guerrero's season was a 2nd-place finish at the Indianapolis 500 where he also shared the race's rookie of the year award with Michael Andretti. Guerrero's best finishes outside of Indianapolis were a pair of 5th-place finishes at the Budweiser Cleveland Grand Prix at Burke Lakefront Airport and the Michigan 500 at Michigan International Speedway. Guerrero finished out the season 11th in points with 52 points, only one point out of the top ten. Guerrero won the series' rookie of the year award.

In 1985 Bignotti went into retirement and the team was reorganized as Team Cotter with Guerrero driving their No. 9 Master Mechanic/True Value March 85C-Cosworth DFX. Compared to the previous season 1985 was a disappointment highlighted by a 3rd-place finish at the Indianapolis 500 and a 4th at the Stroh's 300K at Laguna Seca Raceway. The season also saw Guerrero retire out of a race twice while leading, first at the Michigan 500 at Michigan International Speedway (due to gearbox issues) and then at the Molson Indy 300 at Sanair Super Speedway (due to Guerrero crashing). Guerrero finished the season 17th in points with 34 points.

Guerrero returned with Team Cotter in 1986 to drive their No. 2 True Value/Emerson Electronics March 86C-Cosworth DFX (numbered 5 at Indianapolis only). Guerrero continued his streak of impressive finishes with a 4th place in the race. Guerrero also scored a pair of 2nd-place finishes, first at the Escort Radar Warning 200 at Mid-Ohio Sports Car Course and the Miami Indy Challenge 200 at Tamiami Park. In the latter Guerrero qualified on pole position and led every lap, except the final lap due to running out of fuel and handing the win to Al Unser Jr. Guerrero finished the season 9th in points with 87 points.

In 1987 Cotter sold the team to Vince Granatelli (son of former Indy car owner Andy Granatelli) to form Vince Granatelli Racing with Guerrero driving the No. 4 True Value/STP March 87C-Cosworth DFX. Guerrero scored his first Indy car win at the Checker 200 at Phoenix International Raceway. In the race Guerrero originally qualified 3rd, but the car was declared illegal and Guerrero started 22nd (last) to charge his way up through the field to win. At the Indianapolis 500 Guerrero and Granatelli were one of the few teams to have no issues with March 87C as several teams decided to use year-old 86C models instead. In the race Guerrero qualified 5th and was viewed as among the favorites, along with pole sitter Mario Andretti and defending winner Bobby Rahal. In the race Rahal retired after 57 laps due to ignition problems and Guerrero was in 2nd place to Andretti for much of the race. On the 130th lap a wheel came off of Tony Bettenhausen's car and it hit the nose of Guerrero's car and went flying into the grandstand and where it killed spectator Lyle Kurtenbach. On lap 177 Andretti started to have electrical troubles and Guerrero took the lead. On lap 182 Guerrero came in for his final pit stop and as he exited his pit stall the engine stalled. Third gear had been damaged earlier in the race by the Bettenhausen incident and the car began to get moving, only to stop just outside the pit lane. This caused Al Unser Sr. to take the lead and get a lap on Guerrero. Guerrero finally got going and unlapped himself on lap 191 and there was a caution on lap 192 for Andretti stopping on the track. On lap 196 the restart came out with six cars between Unser and Guerrero. Guerrero was unable to get by Unser and ended up finishing 2nd to one of the year-old March 86Cs to be pressed into race service.

Near-fatal crash and recovery

After his near-win in Indianapolis, subsequently, Guerrero scored four pole positions at the Miller American 200 in Honor of Rex Mays at the Milwaukee Mile, the Budweiser/G.I. Joe's 200 presented by Texaco at Portland International Raceway, Budweiser Grand Prix of Cleveland at Burke Lakefront Airport, and the Escort Radar Warning 200 at Mid-Ohio Sports Car Course. In the latter Guerrero scored his second (and unbeknownst at the time, last) IndyCar victory. Just days after his Mid-Ohio victory, Guerrero was testing at the Indianapolis Motor Speedway, when he crashed and was hit by a tire off of his car. Guerrero was in a coma for seventeen days and did not compete in any more races in 1987. Guerrero finished a career-best 4th in points with 106 points, despite missing the final three races of the season.

Guerrero's recovery from his near-fatal accident was documented by IndyCar Medical Director, Dr. Steve Olvey, who said in his biography, Rapid Response: My Inside-Story as a Motor-Racing Life-Saver, that he saved Guerrero's life by lowering the pressure in his brain with injections of medicines that were brand-new to the medical field and were not widely practiced yet. Somehow, his treatment worked and Guerrero's recovery, which only took less than 3 months, led to him studying traumatic brain injuries as his primary focus of study.

Later career

In 1988 Guerrero returned with Vince Granatelli Racing and originally drove the No. 2 STP/Dianetics: The Evolution of a Science Lola T88/00-Cosworth DFX. At the season-opening Checker 200 at Phoenix International Raceway Guerrero qualified and finished in 2nd place. However, the remainder of the season was mostly a disappointment, such as the Indianapolis 500 where Guerrero qualified 12th and did not even make it out of second due to being collected by Scott Brayton. The team even attempted to use a year-old March 87C at select races to no avail. Guerrero's only top tens after Indianapolis were the Quaker State 500 at Pocono International Raceway in the Lola and the Bosch Spark Plugs Grand Prix at Nazareth Speedway in the March. After starting 10th at Long Beach Guerrero's best start was at Nazareth, where he started 11th. At the end of the season Guerrero finished 12th in points with 40 points, despite skipping two races.

Following the 1988 season Guerrero and Granatelli split for 1989. Guerrero joined Alex Morales Motorsports, who was at the time the factory (and only) team using Alfa Romeo engines. Guerrero drove the No. 21 Alfa Romeo March 89CE-Alfa Romeo Indy V8. The engine ended up being not ready for the start of the season and the team missed the first four races of the year, including the Indianapolis 500. Guerrero was even offered the chance to drive an extra car for Truesports. Guerrero had to decline due to his contract with Alfa Romeo. The team managed to first compete at the Valvoline Detroit Grand Prix on the Streets of Detroit. In the race Guerrero was able to finish 8th. The remainder of the season saw Guerrero score only one additional point due to a 12th-place finish at the Red Roof Inns 200 at Mid-Ohio Sports Car Course. Guerrero would finish 23rd in points with 6 points.

Prior to 1990 Morales Motorsports closed down and Patrick Racing took over the Alfa Romeo project with Guerrero driving the No. 20 Miller Genuine Draft March 90CA-Alfa Romeo Indy V8. Guerrero managed to qualify for the Indianapolis 500, starting 28th and finishing 23rd due to suspension damage. The team then switched to using a Lola T90/00 starting at the Marlboro 500 at Michigan International Speedway. In the race Guerrero finished in 5th place. At the end of the season Guerrero finished 16th in the points with 24 points.

In 1991 Guerrero was replaced by Danny Sullivan and was left without a car to drive. At the Indianapolis 500 Guerrero drove a second car for Patrick Racing in the No. 40 Sharp's Lola T91/00-Alfa Romeo Indy V8. He qualified 28th and finished 30th after being involved in a crash with Kevin Cogan on Guerrero's 24th lap. Guerrero then drove three select races for King Racing in the No. 26 Quaker State Lola T91/00-Buick V6, scoring a best finish of 14th at the Valvoline Detroit Grand Prix on the Streets of Detroit and the Texaco/Havoline Grand Prix of Denver at the Pepsi Center. Guerrero finally drove the No. 50 Fendi/Hawaiian Tropic Lola T91/00-Cosworth DFS at the Molson Indy Toronto at Exhibition Place, qualifying and finishing in 18th place. Guerrero scored no points for the first time in his CART career and finished 37th in the championship.

For 1992 Guerrero drove in a pair of races for the part-time team King Racing, first driving the No. 26 Quaker State Lola T91/00-Buick V6 at the Toyota Grand Prix of Long Beach on the Streets of Long Beach, starting 14th and finishing 13th. At the Indianapolis 500 King updated Guerrero to a Lola T92/00-Buick V6 and the number was changed to 36 (Jim Crawford began to drive the No. 26 car). During qualifying Guerrero set a new four-lap track record of 232.482 mph and a new one-lap record of 232.618 mph on the third lap. Guerrero qualified on pole position and became the first part-time driver to qualify on the pole since Pancho Carter in 1985. In the race Guerrero spun out and crashed on the backstretch during the second parade lap and did not even get to start the race, being credited with 33rd (last) place. Guerrero joined Cliff Woodbury in 1929 and Carter in 1985 as drivers who started first in the Indianapolis 500 and finished last; they were later joined by Greg Ray in 2000 and Scott Sharp in 2001. Guerrero finished 38th in the championship with 1 point.

In 1993 King Racing expanded to a full-time schedule with Guerrero driving their No. 40 Budweiser Lola T93/00-Ilmor-Chevrolet Indy V8 265C. At the Indianapolis 500 Guerrero qualified 10th and finished 28th after being involved in a crash with Jeff Andretti after 125 laps. During the year Guerrero and King consistently qualified in the mid-pack, with a best start of 4th at the Valvoline 200 at Phoenix International Raceway. Guerrero's best finish was also a 4th at the New England 200 at New Hampshire Motor Speedway. Following the Molson Indy Vancouver at Concord Pacific Place King released Guerrero. Guerrero finished 14th in the championship with 39 points (he was 13th in the championship at the time of his release).

In 1994 Guerrero could only get a car to drive at the Indianapolis 500 with Pagan Racing (the same team who owned the car that Jeff Andretti crashed into Guerrero the previous year) in their No. 21 Interstate Batteries Lola T92/00-Buick V6. The chassis was the same chassis that Guerrero drove in 1992. Guerrero qualified 20th and finished 33rd (last) due to a crash after 20 laps. He scored no points and tied for 54th in the championship.

In 1995 Guerrero returned with Pagan Racing in their No. 21 Upper Deck Reynard 94i-Ilmor-Mercedes-Benz IC108B. Guerrero first raced at the Slick 50 200 at Phoenix International Raceway, starting 25th and finishing 16th. The team then competed in the Indianapolis 500, where Guerrero qualified in a respectable 13th place and finished in 12th place. Guerrero finished the season 33rd in the championship with 1 point.

Indy Racing League
In 1996 Guerrero and Pagan Racing began competing full-time in the newly formed Indy Racing League with Guerrero driving the No. 21 WavePhore Reynard 94i-Ford Cosworth XB, with additional sponsorship coming from Johnny Lightning (at Disney), Newscast (at Phoenix) and Pennzoil (at Indianapolis). At the season-opening Indy 200 at Walt Disney World at Walt Disney World Speedway Guerrero qualified 2nd and finished 5th. At the Dura Lube 200 at Phoenix International Raceway Guerrero qualified 3rd and finished 16th due to a broken cv joint. At the Indianapolis 500 the team updated to a Reynard 95i and Guerrero qualified 6th and led for a race-high 47 laps and battled for the win with Tony Stewart, Arie Luyendyk, Davy Jones, Alessandro Zampedri and eventual winner Buddy Lazier. On Guerrero's final pit stop on lap 167 he and Lazier came into the pits. While in the pits the nozzle was connected awkwardly and fuel began to spill out. The car then began to catch fire and Guerrero began to climb out of the car when it was determined to be okay to continue racing. Guerrero fell out of contention and went a lap down. On the final lap of the race, as Lazier and Jones crossed the finish line, Guerrero lost control of his car in turn 4 and took out 4th place Zampedri (who was on the lead lap) and 6th place Eliseo Salazar (who was two laps down) and caused Zampedri to get airborne and flip. Guerrero came to a rest inside the pit lane, just past the entrance. Guerrero finished 4th in the championship with 237 points.

During the 1996 portion of the 1996-1997 season Guerrero continued to drive for Pagan Racing in the No. 21 Pennzoil Reynard 95i-Ford Cosworth XB. At the season-opening True Value 200 at New Hampshire Motor Speedway Guerrero started 18th and finished 6th. Guerrero then drove a Reynard 94i at the Las Vegas 500K at Las Vegas Motor Speedway to start 9th and finish a season-best 4th. Starting at the Indy 200 at Walt Disney World Speedway the series began to use a different type of spec car with Guerrero driving the No. 21 Pennzoil Dallara IR7-Nissan Infiniti Q45 for Pagan Racing. The Infiniti engine was usually slower than the competing Oldsmobile engine and Guerrero's best race with the engine was the Phoenix 200 at Phoenix International Raceway, where he started 10th and finished 7th. At the Indianapolis 500 Guerrero qualified in 19th place and finished 27th after retiring due to a suspension failure after 25 laps with Guerrero running as high as 11th place. Starting with the Samsonite 200 at Pikes Peak International Raceway the team switched to the Oldsmobile Aurora Indy V8. Guerrero's best finish with the Oldsmobile engine came at the Pennzoil 200 at New Hampshire Motor Speedway with a 6th-place finish. At the season-ending Las Vegas 500K at Las Vegas Motor Speedway Guerrero suffered a major accident on lap 201 on the backstretch. Guerrero flipped coming off of turn 2 and flipped into the grass area next to the racetrack. He climbed out of his destroyed car just moments after the accident finished. Guerrero finished the season ranked 7th in points with 221 points.

In 1998 Pagan Racing was left without a sponsor when the team's chief mechanic, John Barnes, formed his own team called Panther Racing using Pagan's former Pennzoil sponsorship. Guerrero drove the No. 21 Pagan Racing Dallara IR8-Oldsmobile Aurora Indy V8. At the season-opening Indy 200 at Walt Disney World Speedway Guerrero qualified 6th and finished 26th after retiring due to a crash after 13 laps. At the Indianapolis 500 Guerrero won the Scott Brayton Award for best showing the spirit of the deceased driver. In the race Guerrero started 9th and finished 22nd, 75 laps down. Following the True Value 500 at Texas Motor Speedway Pagan released Guerrero. Guerrero then joined Cobb Racing to drive the No. 23 CBR G-Force IR01-Nissan Infiniti Q45. Guerrero finished 4th at the Lone Star 500 at Texas Motor Speedway. Guerrero finished 26th in the championship with 83 points.

In 1999 Guerrero returned with Cobb Racing in the No. 50 Cobb Racing G-Force IR01-Nissan Infiniti Q45. Guerrero's best finish of the season was a 13th-place finish at the season-opening Transworld Diversified Services 200 at Walt Disney World Speedway. The team closed down following the Indianapolis 500 where Guerrero started and finished 25th. After Indianapolis Guerrero was ranked 17th in points. He eventually finished 30th in the championship with 36 points.

For 2000 Guerrero managed to get a one-off race for A. J. Foyt Enterprises in the No. 41 Harrah's Dallara IR00-Oldsmobile Aurora Indy V8. Guerrero was unable to qualify for the race, making it the first time since 1989 that he failed to start the Indianapolis 500. Guerrero later competed in the Belterra Resort Indy 300 at Kentucky Speedway for Team Coulson in the No. 40 Team Coulson G-Force GF01-Oldsmobile Aurora Indy V8. In the race Guerrero started 25th and finished 23rd after retiring after 48 laps due to engine troubles in what would be his final Indy car race. Guerrero finished the season 44th in the championship with 7 points.

In 2001 Guerrero had no team at the beginning of practice for the Indianapolis 500. Dick Simon Racing then needed a driver for their No. 7 Yellow Transportation Dallara IR01-Oldsmobile Aurora Indy V8 after Stéphan Grégoire left the team. Guerrero eventually managed to qualify the car. On the final day of qualifying Grégoire began driving for Heritage Motorsports and bumped Guerrero from the field and Guerrero failed to qualify for the second consecutive year.

Guerrero was reported to be searching for a car to drive in the 2002 Indianapolis 500, although nothing materialized. He eventually retired from racing by 2003.

Stock car racing

International Race of Champions
In 1988 Guerrero was among the drivers chosen to compete in IROC XII (International Race of Champions) to be among the drivers to represent CART/PPG World Series (other drivers to represent CART were Al Unser Jr., Al Unser Sr. and Bobby Rahal) based on his performance in 1987. Guerrero drove an identical Chevrolet Camaro, like all other participants. He missed the season-opening race at Daytona International Speedway due to his injuries received the previous year at an Indianapolis Motor Speedway test. Guerrero qualified on the pole position for the second and third races of the season at Riverside International Raceway and Michigan International Speedway. At Riverside Guerrero crashed after 10 laps and finished in 11th place and at Michigan he finished 10th after leading for 4 laps. At the season-ending race at Watkins Glen International Guerrero started 12th and finished 11th, 10 laps down. At the end of the season Guerrero finished 12th (last) in the championship with 19 points, earning $30,400 for his efforts during the season.

NASCAR
Guerrero attempted to compete in the NASCAR Busch Series during the 2000 season at the Carquest Auto Parts 300 at Lowe's Motor Speedway for the Hispanic Racing Team in their No. 72 HRT Motorsports Chevrolet Monte Carlo but failed to qualify for the event. He returned during the 2002 season after his Indy car career was finished, again with the Hispanic Racing Team in their No. 09 Ciclon Energy Drink Chevrolet Monte Carlo at the Aaron's 312 at Atlanta Motor Speedway but again failed to qualify for the race.

Announcing
Guerrero served as a TV live race commentator for SpeedTV and FOX 3 Latin America broadcasts of the American Le Mans Series and the Grand-Am Rolex Sports Car Series from 2009 to 2013.

Racing record

Complete European Formula Two Championship results
(key) (Races in bold indicate pole position; races in italics indicate fastest lap)

Complete Formula One World Championship results
(key)

American Open Wheel racing results
(key) (Races in bold indicate pole position)

USAC

(key) (Races in bold indicate pole position)

CART Indycar World Series

Indy Racing League

Indianapolis 500

NASCAR
(key) (Bold – Pole position awarded by qualifying time. Italics – Pole position earned by points standings or practice time. * – Most laps led.)

Busch Series

International Race of Champions
(key) (Bold - Pole position. * – Most laps led.)

References

External links

Profile at www.grandprix.com
Profile at www.f1rejects.com
Where Are They Now Article

1958 births
Living people
Colombian racing drivers
Colombian Formula One drivers
Ensign Formula One drivers
Theodore Formula One drivers
European Formula Two Championship drivers
Champ Car drivers
IndyCar Series drivers
Colombian IndyCar Series drivers
Indianapolis 500 drivers
Indianapolis 500 polesitters
Indianapolis 500 Rookies of the Year
International Race of Champions drivers
Formula Ford drivers
Sportspeople from Medellín
David Price Racing drivers
A. J. Foyt Enterprises drivers
EuroInternational drivers